Rugby union in Jamaica  is a minor but growing sport. They are currently ranked 67th by World Rugby, with 2,090 registered players. Rugby union in Jamaica is governed by the Jamaica Rugby Football Union.

History 
Rugby was first introduced into Jamaica by the British. Much of the competition is with neighbouring Caribbean islands, visiting ships and touring sides.

Jamaica competes in the Caribbean Championship, a tournament which includes Trinidad and Tobago, Bermuda, Martinique, the Cayman Islands, the Bahamas, British Virgin Islands, Antigua and Guyana.

Jamaica were the most surprising union to announce an interest in hosting the 2019 Rugby World Cup, considering they had never participated in a previous event. The initiative was withdrawn soon after being proposed.

See also 
 Jamaica national rugby union team
 Caribbean Women’s Rugby Championship

References

External links
 Jamaica Rugby
 Jamaica on IRB.com
 Jamaica on rugbydata.com
 Jamaica Official Games
 NAWIRA Jamaica page
 Sports Jamaica Rugby Page

 
Sport in Jamaica by sport